Dharma Durai may refer to:
 Dharma Durai (1991 film), an Indian Tamil-language action drama film
 Dharma Durai (2016 film), an Indian Tamil-language coming-of-age drama film